The 2020–21 Missouri Tigers men's basketball team represented the University of Missouri in the 2020–21 NCAA Division I men's basketball season and was led by head coach Cuonzo Martin, who was in his fourth year at Missouri. The team played its home games at Mizzou Arena in Columbia, Missouri as a ninth-year members of the Southeastern Conference. They finished the season 16-10, 8-8 in SEC Play to finish in 7th place. They defeated Georgia in the Second Round of the SEC tournament before losing in the quarterfinals to Arkansas. They received an at-large bid to the NCAA tournament where they lost in the First Round to Oklahoma.

Previous season
The Tigers finished the 2019–20 season 15–16, 7–11 in SEC play to finish in a tie for 10th place with Arkansas. Missouri never got a chance to play in the 2020 SEC men's basketball tournament because of the coronavirus pandemic.

Departures

Assistant Coach Michael Porter Sr.'s contract was not renewed at the end of the season.

2020 recruiting class

Incoming Transfers

Roster

Schedule and results

|-
!colspan=12 style=|Regular Season

|-
!colspan=12 style=| SEC Tournament

|-
!colspan=12 style=| NCAA tournament

Rankings

*Coaches did not release a week 1 poll.

References

Missouri
Missouri Tigers men's basketball seasons
Missouri Tigers men's basketball
Missouri Tigers men's basketball
Missouri